The 1897 West Virginia Mountaineers football team was an American football team that represented West Virginia University as an independent during the 1897 college football season. In its first and only season under head coach George Krebs, the team compiled a 5–4–1 record and outscored opponents by a total of 92 to 45. Henry M. White was the team captain.

Schedule

References

West Virginia
West Virginia Mountaineers football seasons
West Virginia Mountaineers football